Amanda Serrano (born October 9, 1988) is a Puerto Rican professional boxer, mixed martial artist and professional wrestler. As a boxer, she is the undisputed featherweight world champion, having held the WBO title since 2019 and the WBC and IBO titles since 2021. She is the only female, and Puerto Rican, to win world titles in more than four weight classes, and holds the Guinness World Record for the most boxing world championships won in different weight-classes by a female, having held 9 major world titles across seven different weight classes. Her older sister, Cindy, is also a professional boxer. The pair became the first sisters to hold world titles from major sanctioning bodies at the same time after Cindy won the WBO featherweight title in 2016.

Serrano has been recognized with the Female Boxer of the Year Award twice (2016 and 2018) by the WBO, an entity that also granted her the first "Super World Championship" awarded to a woman. As of March 2021, she is ranked as the world's best active female featherweight by The Ring and BoxRec, and the third best active female, pound for pound, by ESPN and third by The Ring.

Early life and introduction to boxing

Serrano was born in the municipality of Carolina, where her sister Cindy was also born. Her grandparents were born in the municipality of Carolina. When she was young, the family moved to New York and joined the large Puerto Rican diaspora there (colloquially known as Nuyoricans). Surrounded by this community, she grew up in an oasis of Puerto Rican culture in which traditional food and salsa music were predominant. Her upbringing is reflected in the manner in which she speaks Spanish, in a dialect with a distinct accent often attributed to that population (Spanglish)  The family lived in Brooklyn, where she continued to live well into adulthood. During her youth she was an active child, with a distinct passion for swimming. After her sister began boxing training intending to lose weight by attending the gym of her husband Jordan Maldonado, the 12-year old Serrano accompanied her there. She continued frequenting the facility and eventually got her first job there.

Initially Serrano was not as interested in the sport, not even attending a family event to watch the Oscar De La Hoya vs. Félix Trinidad fight, but she was an avid follower of Cindy's career and developed a passion for it as she grew older. When she graduated from Bushwick High School (located in Bushwick, Brooklyn and closed in 2006)  at the age of 17, she decided to begin training as a method to buy things and bond with her sister. Her father supported her decision, but her mother was hesitant until she began earning success and saw it as a way for the elder sister to retire after having her second child. Cindy, knowing that she had already been frustrated during a previous sparring session against a boy, intended to dissuade her by stepping into the ring but the younger sister proved that she could defend herself competently. Admittedly shy, Serrano choose to continue in Maldonado's small gym in Queens with him as trainer, so that the flow of people was controlled and she could focus on her training.
Serrano's amateur career was brief and concluded with a record of only 9–1, but she won the Staten Island amateur championship in 2008. From there she competed in the featherweight division of the New York Daily News Golden Gloves, where she defeated Glenyss Puentevella by referee stopping contest (RSC, the International Boxing Association's equivalent of a technical knockout) in the semifinal and decisioned USA Boxing's national champion Jody-Ann Weller in the final.

Professional boxing career
Serrano is managed and trained by noted female American professional boxing trainer Jordan Maldonado of New York City. Serrano is Boxing 360's first world champion.

NABF Featherweight championship
On June 11, 2011, Amanda defeated Jennifer Scott to capture the vacant NABF featherweight champion. The bout was scheduled for 8 rounds, but the match was cut quick by Serrano knocked out Scott in 1:04 in round 1.

WBC Featherweight Championship
On April 27, 2012, Serrano faced the undefeated Frida Wallberg in Cloetta Center, Linköping, Sweden. The WBC against mandatory rules allowed the bout to be contested with 10 ounce gloves instead of the mandatory 8 ounce for that division. Serrano came up short losing a controversial unanimous decision to Wallberg. The referee was Victor Loughlin and the judges were Gudjon Vilhelm 93-98 | judge: Venciclav Nikolov 93-97 | judge: Franco Ciminale 94–96.

Serrano vs. Bermudez
On March 25, 2021, Serrano KO'd Daniela Bermudez with a body punch in round nine at Plaza del Quinto Centenario, San Juan, Puerto Rico. Serrano retained her WBC/WBO featherweight titles. Heading into the bout, Serrano and Bermudez were ranked inside The Ring's P4P top 10.

Serrano vs. Taylor
The first women's boxing match to headline Madison Square Garden, described as the 'biggest women's fight of all time', was held on April 30, 2022, between Katie Taylor and Serrano, with Taylor’s undisputed lightweight titles on the line. Taylor defeated Serrano by split decision in what was named Fight of the Year by Sports Illustrated.

Mixed martial arts career

Training
Since early 2015, Serrano quietly worked towards debuting in mixed martial arts (MMA), beginning by incorporating kicks to her training. The idea emerged after she participated in the filming of Fight Valley along her sister, meeting Miesha Tate, Holly Holm, and Cristiane Justino and learned of the lifestyle that they could afford. This triggered the interest of people involved in MMA and she was approached and told about the economic potential of the move. When queried about the matter, Serrano expressed additional motivation due to the absence of a Puerto Rican female fighter in Ultimate Fighting Championship (UFC) at the moment.

With the consent of her boxing trainer Jordan Maldonado, Serrano continued her introduction to kickboxing, citing a general lack of money for women in boxing. By the summer of 2016, Serrano admitted that she had seriously considered retiring to take up MMA due to frustration with the state of the business, but that being able to appear in ShoBox changed that. Instead, she began working towards becoming the first person to hold both boxing and MMA titles at once, setting her debut for late 2017. Towards this goal, she continued training in kickboxing under former world champion Luis Ruiz and incorporated Brazilian jiujitsu working with brown belt Gabriel Marte at the Dojo NYC.

Public challenge to Ronda Rousey
On July 31, 2015, Ronda Rousey's trainer, Edmond Tarverdyan, expressed the belief that his fighter "can win the boxing world title" while discussing a potential fight with Justino. After noting that "Ronda spars with boxing world champions that punch way harder than Cyborg", Tarverdyan claimed that she "has never lost a round in the gym. With boxing world champions". Within a week, Serrano responded by stating that "Rousey's trainer does not have any knowledge about the sport of boxing. She is a very good fighter in the Octagon, and I really congratulate her for everything she has done. Her opponents cannot box and it's easy to look great, but when facing a high quality boxer with punching power as myself, believe me, things are gonna change. In a boxing ring, the canvas will be your comfort zone".

She went on to criticize Rousey's stand-up fighting technique and challenging her to a boxing match, stating that "[from a] boxing point of view, she looked like a rookie amateur fighter, throwing very wide punches with no coordination. I heard that Cyborg is not willing to come down to the lightweight division to fight Ronda, but I can go up to 135, and we can settle a boxing match so I can prove her trainer wrong. I once went up to the lightweight division, and traveled to Argentina for a world title fight. At the end, the results was that I became the first ever Puerto Rican female boxer to captured a world title in two weight classes". Serrano's trainer noted that they "do not challenge other fighting styles." And that the reason for calling out Rousey was because they "represent boxing and [...] want to get some respect." by showing "Edmond Tarverdyan how wrong he is about boxing".

Combate Americas
In December 2017, Serrano announced that she had signed with Combate Americas, a MMA promotion that mostly featured Latin American fighters in its roster. Her debut was scheduled for April 13, 2018, when she drew with Corina Herrera after winning the first two rounds but losing the third when forced to the floor. Afterwards, Serrano focused on grappling. This training was put to the test on August 18, 2018, when she won gold in her first career jiu jitsu tournament, a Grappling Industries event held at New York where she gathered four submissions. After winning a sixth world championship in boxing, it was announced that MMA would be Serrano's focus in the foreseeable future due to better salaries.

On October 13, 2018, Serrano won her second fight by submitting Eréndina Ordóñez with a standing rear naked choke in the first round. In February 2019, she participated in her second jiu jitsu competition, defeating Erin Finkeldey in her only bout. Serrano was scheduled to headline her third MMA event (tentatively another fight with Dahiana Santana, making her debut), this one in Puerto Rico, on January 25, 2020. However, the card was postponed due to a series of earthquakes and ultimately cancelled. Serrano considered the “last minute” cancellation frustrating after missing the holidays due to her training. Afterwards, Combate Americas entered into a hiatus caused by the COVID-19 pandemic, remaining inactive until 2021. During this timeframe, Serrano’s contract came to an end and she continued boxing.

iKON Fighting Federation
In May 2021, iKON announced her participation in the main event of a card held at Sinaloa and aired through UFC Fight Pass. On June 11, 2021, Serrano defeated Mexican Valentina García by submission (standing guillotine) in a minute.

Professional wrestling career
At the same time that she made her involvement in MMA public, an interest in potentially joining World Wrestling Entertainment, noted in 2019, Serrano revealed that she had been training under Jonathan Figueroa (known by his ring name Amazing Red) to become a professional wrestler and that she would be performing for a promotion soon.

Professional boxing record

Mixed martial arts record

|-
|Win
|align=center|2–0–1
|Valentina García
|Submission (guillotine choke) 
|iKON Fighting Federation 7 
|
|align=center|1
|align=center|1:00
|Los Mochis, Sinaloa, Mexico
|
|-
| Win
| align=center|1–0–1
| Erendira Ordóñez 
| Submission (rear-naked choke)
| Combate 26: Mexico vs. USA
| 
| align=center| 1
| align=center| 4:23
| Tucson, Arizona, United States 
|
|-
| Draw
| align=center| 0–0–1
| Corina Herrera
| Draw (unanimous)
| Combate 20: Combate Estrellas 1
| 
| align=center| 3
| align=center| 5:00
| Los Angeles, California, United States
| 
|}

Submission grappling record

| colspan="12" style="text-align:center;" | 5 matches, 5 wins (4 submissions)
|- style="text-align:center; background:#f0f0f0;"
! Result
! Record
! Opponent
! Method
! Event
! Division
! Type
! Date
! Round
! Time
! Location
! Notes
|-
|Win || align="center"| 5–0 ||  Erin Finkeldey || Decision (unanimous) || Grappling Industries – BlueBelt No-Gi Jiu-Jitsu || align="center"| -61kg || No-Gi ||  || align="center"| 1 || align="center"| 5:00 ||  Manhattan, New York, U.S. ||
|-
|Win || align="center"| 4–0 ||  Rebecca King || Submission (guillotine choke) || Grappling Industries – No-Gi Jiu-Jitsu || align="center"| -61kg || No-Gi ||  || align="center"| 1 || align="center"| ||  Manhattan, New York, U.S. || Tournament finals – 
|-
|Win || align="center"| 3–0 ||  Cristina Gardella || Submission (armbar) || Grappling Industries – No-Gi Jiu-Jitsu || align="center"| -61kg || No-Gi ||  || align="center"| 1 || align="center"| ||  Manhattan, New York, U.S. || Tournament semi-finals
|-
|Win || align="center"| 2–0 ||  Lulu Zhong || Submission (guillotine choke) || Grappling Industries – No-Gi Jiu-Jitsu || align="center"| -61kg || No-Gi ||  || align="center"| 1 || align="center"| ||  Manhattan, New York, U.S. || Tournament quarter-finals
|-
|Win || align="center"| 1–0 ||  Danielle Riendeau || Submission (guillotine choke) || Grappling Industries – No-Gi Jiu-Jitsu || align="center"| -61kg || No-Gi ||  || align="center"| 1 || align="center"|  ||  Manhattan, New York, U.S. || Tournament preliminaries
|-

Personal life
After becoming a full-time boxer, Serrano adopted a seclusive routine that required not purchasing a cell phone (or any other device that allowed text messages and the sort) to avoid distractions and avoiding getting involved with boyfriends. When asked about it, she insisted that there would be time for that in the future, after carving a legacy. Serrano has noted that one of the prime movers in her boxing career has been to pursue records in possession of foreign athletes and securing them for Puerto Rico (for example, wanting to win a title in a sixth division so that a local could have bragging rights to more divisions than Floyd Mayweather Jr. or wanting to complete concurrent crossovers between sports).

See also
List of Puerto Rican boxing world champions
List of boxing septuple champions

References
Notes

Footnotes

External links

|-

|-

|-

|-

|-

|-

|-

|-

|-

|-

1988 births
Living people
People from Carolina, Puerto Rico
Puerto Rican women boxers
Sportspeople from Brooklyn
Boxers from New York City
Puerto Rican female professional wrestlers
World super-flyweight boxing champions
World bantamweight boxing champions
World super-bantamweight boxing champions
World featherweight boxing champions
World super-featherweight boxing champions
World lightweight boxing champions
World light-welterweight boxing champions
World Boxing Council champions
World Boxing Organization champions
International Boxing Federation champions
International Boxing Organization champions
World Boxing Association champions
The Ring (magazine) champions
Bushwick High School alumni
21st-century American women
Puerto Rican female mixed martial artists
Mixed martial artists utilizing boxing
Submission grapplers